The Bell House, at 7310 Columbia Rd. in rural Metcalfe County, Kentucky, near Edmonton, was listed on the National Register of Historic Places in 2016.

It is a two-and-a-half-story Free Classic-style frame house.

The listing included five contributing resources:  the house, a two-story frame wash house, a chicken house, a storage shed, and a garage. A later-built pump house was deemed non-contributing.

References

Houses on the National Register of Historic Places in Kentucky
Queen Anne architecture in Kentucky
Houses completed in 1909
National Register of Historic Places in Metcalfe County, Kentucky
1909 establishments in Kentucky